První parta is a 1959 Czechoslovak drama film directed by Otakar Vávra.

Cast
 Eduard Cupák as Stanislav Pulpán
 Gustáv Valach as Adam
 Jaroslav Vojta as Suchánek
 Rudolf Deyl as Falta
 Jaroslav Rozsíval as Martínek
 Milan Kindl as Matula
 Bohus Záhorský as Anders
 Marie Tomášová as Adamová
 Vladimír Ráž as Ing. Hansen
 Miriam Kantorková as Hansenová
 František Vnouček as Director of the mine

References

External links
 

1959 films
1959 drama films
Czechoslovak drama films
1950s Czech-language films
Films directed by Otakar Vávra
1950s Czech films